Mista Shaw (born June 1, 1989) is a Ghanaian musician and former member of music duo PhootPrintz. He was born in the city of Tema.

Music career 
In 2013, Mista Shaw and Flyboy Geesus released ‘Jackie Appiah’ under the music duo PhootPrintz. The song featured BET award winner Sarkodie, renowned Ghanaian Singer Bisa Kdei and was produced by Laxio Beats. The song was the group's breakthrough song. Later that year, PhootPrintz released another song called ‘Tell Me What You Want’ featuring Ghana Music Award Winner Flowking Stone, and produced by Magnom Beats.

In 2016, Mista Shaw and his partner parted ways to focus on solo careers and Mista Shaw became the sole owner of PhootPrintz. After going solo, Mista Shaw released his debut single "Popular" on November 17, 2016. , produced by King of Accra. Popular was Number 3 on SoundCity TV's Top 10 Ghana music countdown.

Nominations 
"Tell Me What You Want" by PhootPrintz, Mista Shaw's music group was nominated in the Best Group video category of the MTN 4syteTv Music Video Awards 2016.

Discography 
 2016 – Popular – produced by King of Accra

Videography 
 2016 – Popular – directed by Joy Williams

References 

1989 births
Living people
Ghanaian hip hop musicians